Marsha Francine Warfield (born March 5, 1954) is an American actress and comedian. She grew up on Chicago's South Side, graduating from Calumet High School. She is best known for her 1986–92 role of Roz Russell on the Top 10 rated NBC sitcom Night Court. Roz was the tough, no-nonsense bailiff in Judge Stone's court. Warfield also starred in the sitcom Empty Nest as Dr. Maxine Douglas (1993–95). Before Night Court, she was a writer and performer on the short-lived Richard Pryor Show.

Warfield appeared in feature films such as D.C. Cab (1983) and Mask (1985), hosted The Marsha Warfield Show for ten months (March 1990–January 1991) and has made guest appearances on many television shows, including Riptide, Family Ties, Clueless, Cheers, Living Single, In Living Color, Moesha and Touched by an Angel. She has also done stand-up comedy including appearances on the Norm Crosby hosted The Comedy Shop television series. She won the San Francisco International Comedy Competition in 1979, over such competition as Dana Carvey and A. Whitney Brown.

Personal life
In 2017, Warfield publicly came out stating:

Filmography

Film

Television

References

External links
 

American television actresses
American television talk show hosts
American stand-up comedians
American film actresses
African-American actresses
Actresses from Chicago
1954 births
Living people
American women comedians
20th-century American actresses
20th-century American comedians
21st-century American actresses
21st-century American comedians
Comedians from Illinois
Lesbian comedians
LGBT African Americans
LGBT people from Illinois
American lesbian actresses
20th-century African-American women
20th-century African-American people
21st-century African-American women
21st-century African-American people
American LGBT comedians